The 12813 / 12814 Steel Express  is a Superfast class train operated by Indian Railways connecting Kolkata with the steel-producing city Jamshedpur in Jharkhand state.

It has a Single Dedicated Rake whose Primary Maintenance is done at Tatanagar coaching depot.

Rake Composition 

It is running with LHB coach from 11 June 2018. Advance Reservation Period is of 30 days. Coach composition (22 coaches) is as follows-
 1 Seating cum Luggage coach
 1 Power Generator Car (EOG)
 3 Unreserved accommodation
 12 Second Sitting Coaches
 4 AC Chair Car
 1 Executive Chair Car

Route & halts

Traction

It is hauled by a Tatanagar based WAP-7 locomotive from end to end.

Time Table
From Tatanagar to Howrah- 12814. The train starts from Tatanagar every day

From Howrah to Tatanagar – 12813. The train starts from Howrah every day.

External links
 Indian Rail information site
https://indiarailinfo.com/train/steel-express-12813/1588
https://indiarailinfo.com/train/1589

References

Named passenger trains of India
Rail transport in Howrah
Transport in Jamshedpur
Rail transport in Jharkhand
Rail transport in West Bengal
Express trains in India